Wisigard (c. 510 - c. 540) or Wisigardis was a Frankish Queen by marriage to Theudebert.

Life
The life of Wisigard is slightly known by Gregory of Tours's Historia Francorum. She was daughter of Wacho, king of the Lombards and grew up in the middle Danube region. After an abnormally long term of engagement of seven years, Wisigard married Theudebert I, Merovingian king of Austrasia. Around 531 Theuderich I, father of Theudebert I, had arranged the engagement for political reasons. But because of a liaison Theudebert had with a Roman woman named Deuteria, the union with Wisigard fell through. Anew for political reasons Theudebert abandoned Deoteria and finally married Wisigard in 537 or 538. Shortly after their wedding, she died.

Burial site
In 1959 a very rich decorated grave of a Frankish woman was found by Otto Doppelfeld in the Cologne Cathedral. The woman had been buried with her precious jewelry and in a traditional costume that indicated her as a Lombardish princess. Based on the dating and the grave furniture, Doppelfeld, at that time director of the Romano-Germanic Museum, interpreted the dead woman as Wisigard. However, this interpretation is not proved by an inscription or other sources.

Sources
Gregory of Tours, Historiarum III, 20, 27.

References
Christian Bouyer: Dictionnaire des Reines de France.  Librairie Académique Perrin, 1992 , p. 59.
Otto Doppelfeld: Das fränkische Frauengrab unter dem Chor des Kölner Domes. Germania 38. Frankfurt 1960. pp. 89–113.
Eugen Ewig: Die Merowinger und das Frankenreich. Stuttgart 2001. , p. 34.

Notes

External links
The Frankish royal family in Cologne Cathedral

6th-century Frankish nobility
Merovingian dynasty
Lombard women
Frankish queens consort
510s births
540s deaths
Year of birth uncertain
Year of death unknown
6th-century Frankish women
6th-century Lombard people